The Filmfare Best Actress Award is given by the Filmfare magazine as part of its annual Filmfare Awards South for Malayalam films. The awards were extended to "Best Actress" in 1972. The year indicates the year of release of the film.

Superlatives : Multiple Winners

Winners

Nominations

References

Bibliography
 
 

Actress
Film awards for lead actress